The Combination Game was a style of association football based around teamwork and cooperation. It would gradually favour the passing of the ball between players over individual dribbling skills which had been a notable feature of early Association games.  It developed from "scientific" football and is considered to be the predecessor of the modern passing game of football.  It originated in Britain and its origins are associated with early clubs: Sheffield FC (founded 1857), The Royal Engineers AFC (founded 1863), Queen's Park FC (founded 1867) and Cambridge University AFC (founded 1856).  Each of these claimants is supported by retrospective accounts from men who were notable in the early history of football.  They are considered below in the order of earliest contemporary evidence of "scientific" football playing styles.

Background

The effect of rule changes on playing style
See Offside (association football)

The change to the original offside rule enabled the gradual transition from a dribbling to a passing game. The introduction of a loose offside rule in the FA rules of 1866/67 – at the behest of representatives of Charterhouse and Westminster School – opened the way to forward passing. A similar rule had originally been part of the earlier Cambridge rules.

Charles W. Alcock

The earliest reference to the term "combination game" is made by Charles W. Alcock in 1874 when he states that "Nothing succeeds better than what I may call a 'combination game'." Alcock is referring to an early system of cooperation known as 'backing up' which he defines as a... "process of following closely on a fellow player, to assist him if required, and to take the ball if he be attacked or prevented from continuing his onward course." Although a keen dribbler, Alcock is notable as being the first footballer ever to be ruled offside on 31 March 1866, confirming that players were probing ways of exploiting the new offside rule right from the start. As early as 1870 Alcock stated that he preferred playing football in a "scientific" way. An example of this was reported in a contemporary account of the November 1870 football match between England and Scotland "Mr Alcock made a splendid run ... and being cleverly supported by Mr Walker, a goal was obtained ... by the latter" A further contemporary reference shows that Alcock himself was playing "in concert" with his teammates during the 1871 international match between England and Scotland:

These examples of cooperation fit in with the system of backing up, which was prevalent in the London Association game during the 1860s and early 1870s. As systematic forms of passing became more prevalent in association football, Alcock's views on combination would understandably change. Writing in 1883 he gives the following definition of combination:
 As the game continued to evolve Alcock would state in 1891: "An Association eleven of to-day is altogether a different machine to what it was even as recently as ten years ago.

Scientific Football (1839 onwards)
The earliest uses of the term "scientific" in the context of sport are in the description of the obligatory team game cricket (1833) The first use of the term "scientific" to describe football comes from Dragley Beck, Ulverston, Lancashire in 1839.  This states:

"Scientific" was first used to describe a modern football code in 1862 with reference to Rugby football: and in 1868 the "great science" of rugby football consisted of "off your side, drop kicks punts, places and the other intricacies" It is uncertain what these other intricacies were exactly, however it is clear that this playing style was more systematic than in the past. References to scientific football come in accounts in the mid-1860s, particularly Sheffield FC (see later). Later contemporary accounts include internationals, for example the November 1870 association football match between England and Scotland which "was of unusual excellence for the many scientific points it involved" Alcock advocated scientific football as early as 1870 (see below).

Sheffield FC: Backing up and the "passing on" game (mid-1860s and early 1870s)

According to Alcock, Sheffield FA team provides the first evidence of combination, in particular the "passing on" of the Sheffield FA team and their Sheffield Rules.  The offside system of the Sheffield rules allowed poaching or sneaking and the forward pass was permitted:  Players known as "kick throughs" were positioned permanently near the opponents goal to receive these balls. For this reason the Sheffield style is known as the "passing on game". As early as January 1865 Sheffield F.C. was associated with scoring a goal through "scientific movements" against Nottingham A contemporary match report of November 1865 notes "We cannot help recording the really scientific play with which the Sheffield men backed each other up" Combination associated with Sheffield players is also suggested in 1868: "a remarkably neat and quick piece of play on the part of K Smith, Denton and J Knowles resulted in a goal for Sheffield, the final kick being given by J. Knowles"

Contemporary proof of passing occurs from at least January 1872.  In January 1872 the following account is given against Derby:  "W. Orton, by a specimen of careful play, running the ball up in close proximity to the goal, from which it was returned to J. Marsh, who by a fine straight shot kicked it through" This play taking place "in close proximity to the goal" suggests a short pass and the "return" of the ball to Marsh suggests that this was the second of two passes.  This account also goes onto describe other early tactics:  "This goal was supplemented by one of T. Butler's most successful expositions of the art of corkscrew play and deceptive tactics which had the effect of exciting the risibility of the spectators" A similar account also comes from January 1872:   "the only goal scored in the match was obtained by Sheffield, owing to a good run up the field by Steel, who passed if judiciously to Matthews, and the latter, by a good straight kick, landed it through the goal out of reach of the custodian". This match (against Notts) also provided contemporary evidence of "good dribbling and kicking" particularly by W. E. Clegg.  The condition of the ground, however, "militated against a really scientific exhibition". Their play in March 1872 was described as "speed, pluck and science of no mean order"

The Royal Engineers A.F.C.: The first combination team (late 1860s to mid-1870s)
Sir Frederick Wall (who was the secretary of the Football Association from 1895 to 1934) states in his biography that the combination game was first used by the Royal Engineers A.F.C. in the early 1870s, in particular prior to their 1873 tour of Nottingham, Derby and Sheffield . Wall states that the "Sappers moved in unison" and showed the "advantages of combination over the old style of individualism".  He goes on to state that they were the first "to show the value of combination in Sheffield and Nottingham. Wall attended and regularly refers to the 1872 international match in his account (see below) and speaks very highly of many Scottish teams and players but he does not attribute the combination game to either of these. The Engineers were also capable of dribbling the ball, for example one 1868 match reports states "Lieut. Morris got off and dribbling the ball quite round his opponents, brought it in front of the goal and a kick from Lieut Dorward scored the first goal for the Royal Engineers".

Royal Engineers in 1868
By early 1868 a contemporary match report states "For the R.E.s Lieuts Campbell, Johnson and Chambers attracted especial attention by their clever play"

Royal Engineers in 1869
As early as 1869 the Royal Engineers football club is documented in a contemporary match report as having "worked well together" and "had learned the secret of football success - backing up". In this match failure of the opposite team was attributed to "a painful want of cooperation" against the Engineers.

Royal Engineers in 1870
Another contemporary match report clearly shows that by 1870, ball passing was a feature of the Engineers style: "Lieut. Creswell, who having brought it up the side then kicked it into the middle to another of his side, who kicked it through the posts the minute before time was called"

Royal Engineers in 1871
Although brief, contemporary match reports confirm that passing was a regular feature of the Engineers' style.  For example, in a match of February 1871 against Crystal Palace it is noted that "Lieut. Mitchell made a fine run down the left, passing the ball to Lieut. Rich, who had run up the centre, and who pinced another [goal]" The Engineers used their team playing style with effect against the Wanderers, a side considered as early as 1870 to be the MCC of football. In a match of March 1871 against Wanderers their victory was due to "irreproachable organisation" and in particular that both their attacks and their backing up were both "so well organised" In November 1871 similar passing tactics are described in a contemporary account of a game against the Wanderers in which two goals were scored through tactical passing: "Betts, however, soon seized his opportunity, and by a brilliant run down the left wing turned the ball judiciously to Currie, who as judiciously sent it flying through the strangers' goal in first rate style" Later in the match it is reported that "Lieut. G Barker, turning the ball to Lieut. Renny-Tailyour who planted it between the posts"  "Turning" the ball clearly points to the short pass.

Royal Engineers in 1872
There is evidence that opponents sometimes adjusted their playing style to counteract the organisation and passing of the Engineers. For example, in February 1872 against Westminster school a brief contemporary match report states that:  "The school captain took the precaution of strengthening his backs, deputizing HDS Vidal to cooperate with Rawson and Jackson and so well did these three play in concert... they succeeded in defying the... RE forwards" What is most notable about this report is that it confirms that the Royal Engineers "played beautifully together" That the Engineers were the first side to break the trend of dribbling is shown in a contemporary account of their victory against Crystal Palace in early 1872.  This said that:  "very little dribbling was displayed"

Summary of the Royal Engineers early playing style
The evidence above contains detailed descriptions of passing that are lacking in reports of the 1872 Glasgow international.  For example, in a lengthy account The Scotsman newspaper makes no mention of passing or combination by the Scottish team and specifically describes the Scottish attacks in terms of dribbling: "The Scotch now came away with a great rush, Leckie and others dribbling the ball so smartly that the English lines were closely besieged and the ball was soon behind" and "Weir now had a splendid run for Scotland into the heart of his opponents' territory." Although the Scottish team are acknowledged to have worked better together during the first half, this contemporary account acknowledges that in the second half England played similarly: "During the first half of the game the English team did not work so well together, but in the second half they left nothing to be desired in this respect."  The Scotsman concludes that the difference in styles in the first half is the advantage the Queens' Park players had "through knowing each other's play" as all came from the same club.  Unlike the 1872 Glasgow international - which was drawn - the contemporary evidence above shows that the Engineers' team playing style benefited their team play by winning games. Similarly, the 5 March 1872 match between Wanderers and Queen's Park contains no evidence of ball passing.

The early accounts cited above all confirm that the Engineers were the first club to play a passing game of cooperation and organisation with both their forwards and their defence. Although they could also play rough – as would be expected for an army team – The Engineers are the first side to be considered to play the football "beautifully". All of these developments clearly occurred before and independent of the 1872 match between England and Scotland (Queen's Park FC).  It is probable that Queen's Park FC observed the Engineers' passing game during one of their visits to England to participate in the 1871–72 FA Cup.  Undoubtedly, their representatives in London were well aware of the Sheffield and Engineers' style.

Queens Park FC, 1867 - 1882: Pioneers of the Modern Passing Game
Within the context of the emerging Association game in Scotland, the late historian and broadcaster Bob Crampsey compared the role of the Queen's Park club with that of the MCC in Cricket and The Royal and Ancient Golf Club in Golf.  The Glasgow club's control of the early playing rules in Scotland, early management of the Scotland national team, and instigation of the Scottish Football Association and Scottish Challenge Cup provide evidence of their status as the 'Premier' or 'Senior' club of Scotland.  Within this context, the club's development of a scientific form of combination, which would supersede existing playing styles, should be considered.

The most obvious outcome from the successful implementation of a football culture is the creation of a 'legacy'.  Due to the club's unceasing commitment to promote the game across Scotland, the Queen's Park playing style quickly became a 'Scottish style'.  This playing style was imported into the north and midlands of England during the 1870s and 1880s, by the club itself, by other Scottish clubs, and by an increasing wave of Scottish footballers, who are often referred to by contemporary commentators as 'Scotch Professors', (because of the science of their game). The passing game, as a significant football culture, does not arrive in London until the creation of the London Corinthians in 1882 (in response to Scottish supremacy at international level). Between 1872 and 1887 Scotland would win 10 times and lose only twice against England in the annual internationals.  The impact of the Scotch Professors in the midlands and north of England would lead to the legalisation of professionalism in 1885 and the development of league football in 1888.

The Rules of the Field, 1867
On 9 August 1867, one month after the club's formation, the 'Rules of the Field' were discussed and accepted by the Queen's Park committee.  They were based on the Association rules of the period but the club made a number of changes, the most notable being the offside rule.  In 1866 the FA had moved from a rugby style offside rule preventing the ball from being passed forward to a three-man ruling.  Queen's Park would adopt an even more radical approach, which by its design, would open up the game even more to the forward pass. The rule was recorded as follows,

Offside only came into being 15 yards from the goal and even then only two defenders were required to be goal side for a player to be onside. The openness of the rule allowed players to be deployed across the field and encouraged the forward pass. In some respects the rule has similarity to the Sheffield Rules in that it enabled the long forward pass but, unlike the Sheffield code, it also prevented players from poaching or sneaking in front of goal. This carefully considered adaptation of the offside rule demonstrates the meticulous planning and organisation behind the club. It would win the club many admirers including William McGregor, 'Father of the Football League', who pays the following tribute,

Although the game of the late 1860s was rudimentary, the basis for the club's playing style, and the men who would make it happen, all date from this early period.  From this era the passing game of Queen's Park would evolve from simplistic to systematic forms of combination which would be copied throughout Scotland and the UK.

Regular practice and instruction, 1868 – 1872
At a time when matches against other clubs were difficult to arrange, Queen's Park played internal matches dividing up its membership.  As Richard Robinson in his early history of the club explains regular practice and instruction, key elements of the combination game, were already being undertaken.

Robert Gardner (who captained and picked the Scotland team in the first official international match), as captain of the club, had a profound influence over tactics and team selections. In the match against Hamilton Gymnasium on 29 May 1869 he distributed cards to his team before the match showing each man where he must play. According to Robinson it was the regular practise games that enabled Queen's Park to develop their brand of combination football.

Queen's Park and 2-2-6 formation, 1872
Combination was very much in evidence in both the FA Cup tie against the Wanderers (5 March 1872) and in the international match against England (30 November 1872). In both games the club lined up in a 2-2-6 formation which would be their preferred line up for the remainder of the decade.  In the international match Queen's Park organised the game and provided all of the Scotland players from within its own membership.  The club would form the backbone of the Scotland national team throughout the 1870s and well into the 1880s.  The tactic of combination was certainly successful in combating the superior weight and strength of the opposing players. In the game against Wanderers, the Field magazine wrote of Queen's Park,

The Herald, in the same game noted that,

In the first official international match, the first specific reference to a collective passing culture is recorded within the history of Association football. The earliest contemporary reference, dating from 14 December 1872, appears in The Graphic, a weekly illustrated newspaper published in London, and gives clear detail as to the opposing playing styles of the two teams:

Testament to the combination style of football adopted by Queen's Park in the game is given in an eyewitness account by Walter Arnott, who would himself become a leading player for Queen's Park, Corinthians and Scotland during the 1880s and early 1890s.  Arnott gives a clear description of the historic event at which he was present as a spectator.  Once again the difference in weight is mentioned,

It would appear that the Queen's Park players, unable to match their opponents individually for strength, paired up to stop the dribbling runs of the England players when defending their own goal and played short passes on the run when attacking their opponent's goal.  References alluding to the fact that the Scotland players 'worked from first to last well together, through knowing each other's play' can be found in the Scotsman. while the Glasgow Herald comments that, "The strong point of the home club was that they played excellently well together."

Creating a Scottish style
Queen's Park took their brand of football to other parts of Scotland, arranging exhibition matches in Dunbartonshire, Edinburgh and Dundee.  The game that they promoted was quite different from the 'backing up' style of the Royal Engineers and the 'passing on' game of Sheffield.  In a match against Vale of Leven, played in February 1873, the Glasgow club's systematic form of passing is highlighted in the match report,

Their passing game became a Scottish style which was distinctive from other parts of the UK.  An early example of other Scottish clubs emulating the passing style and 2-2-6 formation of Queen's Park can be found in January 1874.  The Glasgow Herald'''s report on the match between the 3rd Lanark and Western clubs states,

Dribbling and Passing
The argument contained within the Royal Engineers section which opposes the Scottish view of the first international match focuses on the contemporary Scotsman newspaper article which gives reference to Scottish players dribbling the ball. The Scottish argument, however, contends that the playing style of the Queen's Park players, throughout the 1870s, accommodated both dribbling and passing.  The evidence is certainly plentiful. This can be seen in The Graphic newspaper article which on the one hand refers to the Scottish team as being adept at passing the ball but on the other also presents evidence of Scottish players dribbling the ball,

In short, the playing tactics of Queen's Park FC allowed for the ball to be passed when possession was about to be lost or when a greater advantage could be attained; the dribble forward was augmented with a short pass to a teammate.

Writing in the Football Annual in 1883, Charles W. Alcock observed that,

Tellingly C.W. Alcock, the FA's most influential administrator during the 1860s and 1870s, makes no reference in any of his numerous articles to the role of the Royal Engineers in developing a passing game. This confirms that the backing up system of the Engineers did not involve systematic passing.

In contrast to this, the newspaper article which features Queen's Park's victory over Wanderers in October 1875 (a match in which C.W. Alcock and the Anglo Scot A.F. Kinnaird played in for Wanderers) gives a concise description of the style of combination adopted by the club, particularly in the section which describes the second and third goals,

The passing game and Scottish supremacy
In the south east of England as the coordinated system of 'backing up' began to decline, the systematic passing game of Queen's Park would eventually win through. It was England's 5–1 defeat in 1882 to a Scotland team featuring seven Queen's Park players which led to Nicholas Lane Jackson, a prominent member of the FA, creating the famous Corinthians team. This direct reaction to the success of Queen's Park and the Scotland national team is quoted in the book Corinthians and Cricketers,

The rudimentary 'passing on' game of Sheffield could not compete with the scientific short passing style championed by Queen's Park and at representative level the Glasgow FA would experience 14 wins and only one defeat against the Sheffield FA in the 17 fixtures played between 1874 and 1890. A good example of the difference in playing styles is cited in the Scottish Football Annual of 1877/78 which gives the following comments on the Glasgow v Sheffield match of 1877,

Legacy of the Scottish combination game
Queen's Park's combination game, which had emerged as a general 'Scottish style' due to the club's high standing and her energetic promotion of the game, would spread south of the border, to the north and midlands of England, through the efforts of the club and with the arrival of the Scotch Professors. William McGregor, the Father of the Football League and president of Aston Villa FC, pays the following tribute,

Teams throughout England, from Sunderland (the team of all the talents), Preston North End (Invincibles), Liverpool F.C. (the team of the Macs), Bolton Wanderers, Sheffield Wednesday and Blackburn Rovers in the north, to Aston Villa and Derby County in the Midlands, and Arsenal, Fulham and Southampton in the South were greatly influenced by the Scottish style through the importation of Scotch Professors, trained in the Queen's Park style. British administrators and coaches would take the Scottish short passing game overseas. These include Jimmy Hogan, John Cameron, Jock Hamilton, Fred Pentland, Alexander Watson Hutton, John Harley and John Dick.

The wealthy miner Samuel Tyzack, who alongside and shipbuilder Robert Turnbull funded the Sunderland A.F.C. "team of all talents," often pretended to be a priest while scouting for players in Scotland, as Sunderland's recruitment policy in Scotland enraged many Scottish fans. In fact, the whole Sunderland lineup in the 1895 World Championship was made from entirely Scottish players.

Sunderland striker, the Scot John Campbell, became league top scorer three times, in all of which Sunderland won the league. Important to his success in attack were other "Team of All Talents" players from Scotland: Jimmy Hannah and Jimmy Millar. Their goalkeeper Ned Doig set a 19th-century world record by not conceding any goals in 87 of his 290 top division appearances (30%).

Preston North End, the first English team to win the Championship and Cup "double", did so with a majority of their team being made up of Scottish players. In the first season, they went undefeated both in the league and the FA Cup, which led to them being known as "the invincibles."

Cambridge University AFC: The first modern formation (early 1880s)

See also Cambridge University AFC Parkers Piece

In a detailed investigation into the evolution of football tactics based upon contemporary accounts, Adrian Harvey of the University of London refers to the teams responsible for the early development of the passing game (including Sheffield, The Royal Engineers and "the short passes beloved of [Scotland's] Queens Park") but comes to the following conclusion about the finished, modern team product:

"Curiously, the side that was generally credited with transforming the tactics of association football and almost single-handedly inventing the modern game was not a professional team but the Cambridge University XI of 1882.  Contemporaries described Cambridge as being the first "combination" team in which each player was allotted an area of the field and played as part of a team in a game that was based upon passing"

In an 1891 discussion by CW Alcock on the history of a "definite scheme of attack" and  "elaborate combination" in early football playing styles (including references to "Northern" teams, including Queens Park), Alcock states:  "The perfection of the system which is in vogue at the present time however is in a very great measure the creation of the last few years.  The Cambridge University eleven of 1883 were the first to illustrate the full possibilities of a systematic combination giving full scope to the defence as well as the attack" The 1883 Cambridge University side was the first team to introduce the "pyramid" 2 3 5 formation (two defenders, three midfield, and five strikers).Wilson Jonathon, Inverting the Pyramid: a History of Football Tactics, Orion, 2008 Following the success of the "Cambridge pyramid" this formation became the norm for all football teams.

Alcock goes onto say:  "It was about this time [1883] that the third half back came to be recognized as a necessity of the new formation, and though the Scotch players were slow to acknowledge an innovation emanating from England, which forms the keystone of the formation of to-day"

The key role played by Cambridge University AFC in developing the modern game of football is also supported by the football historian Sir Montague Shearman.

Combination by Cambridge University FC is suggested in contemporary accounts as early as December 1872: "The goal for the university was the result of the combined efforts of Adams, Sparham and Smith". In this account Cambridge "played well together".

Other early passing sides

Combination play is also reported from other English sides, for example Derby School against Nottingham Forest, where a double pass is reported, the first of which is irrefutably a short'' pass.  In this March 1872 match:  "Mr Absey dribbling the ball half the length of the field delivered it to Wallis, who kicking it cleverly in front of the goal, sent it to the captain who drove it at once between the Nottingham posts" Other early passing sides include the Shropshire Wanderers in the 1875/76 season Nottingham Forest themselves also provide early evidence of passing, for example in February 1872 "Mr Widowson ...several times ...crossed it to their front player. Certain Lancashire sides (for example Blackburn Olympic) have also been considered to be innovators of the early passing game.  "Systematic play" was part of other sides, for example Trent College in April 1872

Possibly the most important passing manoeuvre in the early history of the game was the pass from Reverend Vidal ("the prince of the dribblers") to M.P. Betts who then scored the only goal in the first ever FA cup final in March 1872. The report in the Field of this match suggests combination: this was 'the fastest and hardest match that has ever been seen at The Oval ... some of the best play on their [Wanderers] part, individually and collectively, that has ever been shown in an Association game."

The Corinthians F.C. are also credited with bringing into being the modern passing football game, for example by Sir Frederick Wall. This is likely to have been due to the influence of the Cambridge team on the Corinthians' playing style.

References

Association football tactics
History of football in England
History of football in Scotland